"Buried and Dead" is a song by Australian rock group, the Masters Apprentices, released in May 1967 on Astor Records as the second single from the band's debut self-titled extended play. It peaked at No. 26 on the Go-Set national singles charts.

Background 
In mid-1966 Adelaide-based rock group, the Masters Apprentices, shared a gig with pop star, Bobby Bright (of Melbourne duo, Bobby & Laurie), who was impressed and recommended them to his label, Astor Records. A few weeks later, they were contacted by Astor's Max Pepper, who requested a four-track demo. The band went to a local two-track studio to record it, but realised that they had only three suitable songs: "Hot Gully Wind", "Buried and Dead" and "She's My Girl".

The group relocated to Melbourne and the demo, including the newly written, "Undecided", became their debut extend play, The Masters Apprentices (February 1967).

"Buried and Dead" and "She's My Girl" were lifted from the EP and released as its second single in May, which peaked at No. 26 on the Go-Set Top 40 national singles chart and spent eight weeks in the top forty. The single also peaked in the top ten charts in most Australian capital cities. Both sides were written by the group's rhythm guitarist, Mick Bower. The band made a promotional film clip for "Buried and Dead" for TV (at their own expense), which their lead singer, Jim Keays, believed was one of the first music videos made in Australia.

Track listing

Personnel 

The Masters Apprentices
 Mick Bower – rhythm guitar
 Jim Keays – lead vocals
 Rick Morrison – lead guitar
 Brian Vaughton – drums
 Gavin Webb – bass guitar

Recording and artwork
 Graphic artist, art director – Darrin Crosgrove
 Producer – Max Pepper

References 

General
  Note: limited preview for on-line version.
 
  Note: Archived [on-line] copy has limited functionality.
  Note: [on-line] version was established at White Room Electronic Publishing Pty Ltd in 2007 and was expanded from the 2002 edition. As from September 2010 the [on-line] version is no longer available.

Specific

1967 singles